Albert Perry Brigham, A.M. (1855–1932) was an American geologist, educated at Colgate College, Hamilton Theological Seminary, and Harvard University.

Early life
Albert Perry Brigham was born in Perry, New York, on June 12, 1855.

Ordination
He was ordained a Baptist minister and held pastorates at Stillwater, N. Y. (1882–85) and at Utica, N. Y. (1885–91). From 1892 onward, he worked in the field of geology at different places and in different positions.

Personal life
Brigham married Flora Winegar on June 27, 1882, and they had one daughter.

He died in Washington, D.C., on March 21, 1932.

Publications
Besides having been editor of the Bulletin of the American Geographical society, he was author of:  
 A Text-Book of Geology (1900)  
 Geographic Influences in American History (1903)  
 Student's Laboratory Manual of Physical geography (1904)  
 From Trail to Railway through the Appalachians (1907)  
 Commercial Geography  (1910)
 Essentials of Geography (1916)

References

Baptist ministers from the United States
American geologists
Harvard University alumni
American non-fiction writers
1855 births
1932 deaths
People from Perry, New York
People from Stillwater, New York
Writers from Utica, New York
Presidents of the American Association of Geographers
Baptists from New York (state)